The Griffon Hoverwork BHT130 is a medium-size hovercraft, designed by Hoverwork and fitted out in St Helens.
The type was found to be unsuitable and was withdrawn after 4 years in service (2007-2011). 

As a civil passenger hovercraft it seats up to 130 passengers, hence the numerics in its name, the first welded aluminium hull (fabricated by Aluminium Ship Builders, Fishbourne, Isle of Wight) arrived at Hoverwork's St Helens works in August 2005.

The first of its kind, named the Solent Express entered cross-Solent service on 14 June 2007; also, in the July of the same year, it was put on trial at a new passenger service between Kirkcaldy and Portobello across the Firth of Forth in Scotland. It remained in service on the Solent until 2011 when it was laid up at Griffon Hoverwork.

Technical specifications 
29.3 m long
15 m beam
70 tonne all up weight
Service speed over water 45 knots
130 passengers
4 crew
Lift engines - 2 x MTU 12V2000-R1237K37 diesels - each producing 675kW
Propulsion engines - 2 x MTU 16V2000-R1637K37 diesels producing 899kW
2 x 3.5-metre-diameter, five-bladed, variable-pitch propellers for propulsion

Hovercraft
Ships built on the Isle of Wight